Forest Lake Area High School, also known as Forest Lake High School, is a public four-year high school in Forest Lake, Minnesota, United States, founded in 1909. The school is a member of Minnesota Independent School District 831 (Forest Lake Area School District). The school competes in the Suburban East Conference of the Minnesota State High School League.

From 1941 to 1963, Forest Lake High School’s “Forest Breeze” newspaper was named the best school newspaper in the state of Minnesota, and one of the 10 best in the country, being named the number one school newspaper in the country several times in the 1940s.

Forest Lake High School was shown by the Minnesota Report Card to have proficiency in math at 60.3%, reading at 61.3% and science at 58.5%.  The graduation rate is 84.8%.

Forest Lake High School was named one of the top 1,500 high schools in the country by Newsweek Magazine in 2013.

Forest Lake High School was one of only 35 schools from around the country to be awarded the United States Department of Education Green Ribbon award for its environmental efforts in May 2019.

Athletics

Forest Lake Area High School has won state team championships in:
 	
Wrestling—1993
Boys' True Team Track & Field—1993
Boys' Nordic Skiing—2005	
Boys' Nordic Skiing—2006	
Boys' Nordic Skiing—2008	
Boys' Nordic Skiing—2009	
Boys' Nordic Skiing—2014	
Boys' Alpine Skiing—2015	
Boys' Alpine Skiing—2015	
Boys' Nordic Skiing—2020
Girls' Nordic Skiing—2021
Girls' Softball-2022<ref
Name="auto1"/>

Odyssey of the Mind

The Forest Lake Area High School Odyssey of the Mind teams won state championships in 1992 and 1993.

Notable people

Patricia Anderson, former Minnesota state auditor. (1984)
Rick Bayless, All-Big 10 and Minnesota Vikings running back. (1983)
James B. Bullard, president of the Federal Reserve Bank of St. Louis.  (1979)
Dick Furey, former professional basketball player, was basketball, football and baseball coach at Forest Lake High School.
Patrick Gleason, comic book artist.  (1995)
Jeff Graba, head coach of Auburn Tigers women's gymnastics.  (1987)
Nora Greenwald, known as Molly Holly during her career as a WWE world champion pro wrestler. (1996)
Adam Haayer, former Tennessee Titans, Minnesota Vikings and Arizona Cardinals lineman. (1996)
Douglas Harper, sociologist and photographer.  (1966)
Hal Haskins, was head basketball coach here 1955-1957
 Pete Hegseth, former Executive Director of Vets For Freedom. (1999)
Dave Menne, the first UFC (Ultimate Fighting Championship) middleweight champion.  (1993)
Leif Nordgren, 2014 and 2018 Winter Olympic Games athlete in biathlon. (2007)
Bud Nygren, football player and coach. (1936)
Randolph W. Peterson, Minnesota state legislator and judge.  (1971)
Brian Raabe, was a baseball coach here 2001-2011
Christopher Sieber, Two-time Tony Award nominated actor from such productions as Spamalot and Shrek the Musical. (1988)
C.J. Suess, professional hockey player with Winnipeg Jets. (2012)
Jordis Unga, popular singer, (Rock Star: INXS) and The Voice attended Forest Lake High School through 1999.
Matt Wallner, All-American college baseball player, signed by the Minnesota Twins. (2016)

References

Public high schools in Minnesota
Educational institutions established in 1912
Schools in Washington County, Minnesota
1912 establishments in Minnesota